Blue belt may refer to:

The Blue Belt, a Norwegian fairy tale
Blue Belt (Pittsburgh), the Allegheny County road belt system
Blue belt, a rank in martial arts (see Kyū)
Blue belt (Brazilian Jiu-Jitsu), a level in the Brazilian jiu-jitsu ranking system
Blue Belt Programme, a marine protection and sustainable management programme of the British Overseas Territories
Staten Island Bluebelt, a storm water management system

See also
 Blue Line (disambiguation)
 Blue Route (disambiguation)